Naskapi (also known as / in the Naskapi language) is an Algonquian language spoken by the Naskapi in Quebec and Labrador, Canada. It is written in Eastern Cree syllabics.

The term Naskapi is chiefly used to refer to the language of the people living in the interior of Quebec and Labrador in or around Kawawachikamach, Quebec. Naskapi is a "y-dialect" that has many linguistic features in common with the Northern dialect of East Cree, and also shares many lexical items with the Innu language.

Although there is a much closer linguistic and cultural relationship between Naskapi and Innu than between Naskapi and other Cree language communities, Naskapi remains unique and distinct from all other language varieties in the Quebec-Labrador peninsula.

Phonology 

Orthography
There are two writing systems used for Naskapi language. One is Latin, similar to Innu Language (Montagnais), and the other is Cree syllabics, similar to James Bay Cree, as well as other dialects of Cree across Canada.

Latin
The long form is either written with a circumflex accent, e.g. , or by simply writing the vowel twice, e.g. . The vowel also consists of 12 consonants (including the  digraph)

 Ch, K, P, and T are voiced between vowels.
 L and R are only used in loanwords from other languages.

Syllabary
Naskapi Syllabics is derived from Canadian Aboriginal syllabics, and while having its unique characteristics, shares many features with other Canadian Cree Syllabic systems.
Unlike other Cree Syllabics, long and short vowels are not distinguished. 
The final forms in Naskapi Syllabics are similar to other varieties of Eastern Cree syllabics.

Notes

External links
 Naskapi Lexicon
 Languagegeek: Naskapi
 Naskapi Language
OLAC resources in and about the Naskapi language

Central Algonquian languages
Indigenous languages of the North American eastern woodlands
First Nations languages in Canada
Naskapi